U4/U6 small nuclear ribonucleoprotein Prp4 is a protein that in humans is encoded by the PRPF4 gene.
The removal of introns from nuclear pre-mRNAs occurs on complexes called spliceosomes, which are made up of 4 small nuclear ribonucleoprotein (snRNP) particles and an undefined number of transiently associated splicing factors. PRPF4 is 1 of several proteins that associate with U4 and U6 snRNPs.[supplied by OMIM]

References

Further reading

Spliceosome